Keat is a surname. Notable people with this surname include:

 Keat Chhon (born 1934), Cambodian politician
 Dan Keat (born 1987), New Zealand football player
 Larissa Keat (born 1989), Swiss actress
 Preston Keat (born 1966), American political scientist
 Russell Keat, British political theorist

See also
 KEAT (disambiguation)
 Keats (disambiguation)